The 19th General Assembly of Prince Edward Island represented the colony of Prince Edward Island between February 9, 1854, and May 10, 1854.

The Assembly sat at the pleasure of the Governor of Prince Edward Island, Alexander Bannerman.   John Jardine was elected speaker.

Edward Palmer, the leader of the Conservative Party, chose John Myrie Holl, a member of the Legislative Council, as Premier.

Members

The members of the Prince Edward Island Legislature after the general election of 1854 were:

Notes:

External links 
 Journal of the House of Assembly of Prince Edward Island (1854)

Terms of the General Assembly of Prince Edward Island
1854 establishments in Prince Edward Island
1854 disestablishments in Prince Edward Island